The 1998–99 Gamma Ethniki was the 16th season since the official establishment of the third tier of Greek football in 1983. Egaleo and Olympiacos Volos were crowned champions in Southern and Northern Group respectively, thus winning promotion to Beta Ethniki. Panegialios and Naoussa also won promotion as a runners-up of the groups.

Levadiakos, Rethymniakos, Panargiakos, Achaiki, Aiolikos, Aetos Skydra, Preveza, Ampelokipi, Kastoria and Doxa Drama were relegated to Delta Ethniki.

Southern Group

League table

Relegation play-off

|}

Northern Group

League table

References

Third level Greek football league seasons
3
Greece